Ernest Richard Kouma (November 23, 1919 – December 19, 1993) was a soldier in the United States Army during World War II and the Korean War. He rose to the rank of master sergeant and received the Medal of Honor for his actions on August 31 and September 1, 1950, during the Second Battle of Naktong Bulge in South Korea.

Born in Nebraska, Kouma grew up on a family farm before enlisting in the Army in 1940. Kouma served as a tank commander during World War II, seeing combat in Germany with the 9th Armored Division from 1944 to 1945. After that war, Kouma served as part of the occupation force in South Korea and Japan.

On the outbreak of the Korean War, Kouma commanded an M26 Pershing tank in the 2nd Infantry Division. While fighting during the Battle of Pusan Perimeter along the Naktong River, Kouma commanded his tank as it single-handedly fended off repeated North Korean attempts to cross the river after units around it had withdrawn. Wounded twice, Kouma killed 250 North Korean troops in this action.

After receiving the medal, Kouma served as a recruiter and remained in the Army for 31 years, retiring in 1971. He lived in Kentucky until his death, and is buried in Fort Knox, Kentucky.

Biography
Ernest Richard Kouma was born on November 23, 1919, in Dwight, Nebraska, to a farming family. He spent much of his early life on the family farm before enlisting in the United States Army in June 1940.

World War II
When the United States entered World War II, Kouma was trained as an armor crewman. He was assigned to the 9th Armored Division. The division landed in Normandy late in September 1944 and moved to the front lines on October 23. Its first mission was patrol duty in a quiet sector along the Luxembourg-German frontier. When the Germans launched their winter offensive, the 9th Armored Division was quickly involved in the Battle of the Bulge with next to no experience. The division saw very heavy action at St. Vith, Echternach and Bastogne, its units, unprepared to counter the offensive, fighting in widely separated areas.

The 9th Armored Division made a stand at Bastogne and held off the Germans long enough to enable the 101st Airborne Division to dig in for a defense of the city, resulting in the Battle of Bastogne. After a rest period in January 1945, the 9th Armored Division made preparations for a drive across the Roer River. The offensive was launched on February 28, and the unit smashed across the Roer to Rheinbach, sending patrols into Remagen. The Ludendorff Bridge at Remagen was found intact, and was seized by elements of the 9th Armored minutes before demolition charges were set to explode on March 7, 1945. The division exploited the bridgehead, moving south and east across the Lahn River toward Limburg, where thousands of Allied prisoners were liberated. The division drove on to Frankfurt and then turned to assist in the closing of the Ruhr Pocket. In April, it continued east, encircled Leipzig and secured a line along the Mulde River. The division was shifting south to Czechoslovakia when the war in Europe ended on V-E Day in May 1945.

Following the end of the war, Kouma decided to stay in the Army. He was moved to South Korea for occupation duties before being moved to Japan for the post-war occupation of that country. Eventually, Kouma was assigned as a tank commander in A Company, 72nd Tank Battalion, 2nd Infantry Division, which was stationed at Fort Lewis, Washington. By this time, he had a home in Penobscot County, Maine, when he was not at Fort Lewis.

Korean War
Following the outbreak of war between North Korea and South Korea on June 25, 1950, the United States mobilized a large contingent of troops to send into the beleaguered country. Initially, units occupying Japan were sent, but forces were eventually dispatched from the United States. In August 1950, Kouma, who was then a sergeant first class, sailed for Korea along with much of the 2nd Infantry Division. It arrived there in late August and was moved into the line at the Pusan Perimeter, where American troops were holding a tight defensive line around the port city of Pusan.

The North Korean People's Army, meanwhile, was preparing for a September offensive by capturing the Miryang and Samnangjin areas to cut off the 2nd Division's route of supply and withdrawal between Daegu and Busan. However, the North Koreans were unaware that the 2nd Infantry Division had recently replaced the 24th Infantry Division in positions along the Naktong River. Consequently, they expected lighter resistance; the troops of the 24th were exhausted from months of fighting, but the men of the 2nd Division were fresh and newly arrived in Korea. They had only established their lines shortly before the North Koreans began their attack. The North Koreans began crossing the Naktong River under cover of darkness at certain points. On the southernmost flank of the US 9th Infantry Regiment river line, just above the junction of the Nam River with the Naktong, A Company of the 1st Battalion was dug in on a long finger ridge paralleling the Naktong that terminates in Hill 94 at the Kihang ferry site. The river road from Namji-ri running west along the Naktong passes the southern tip of this ridge and crosses to the west side of the river at the ferry. A patrol of tanks and armored vehicles, together with two infantry squads of A Company, 9th Infantry, held a roadblock near the ferry and close to Agok. On the evening of August 31, A Company moved from its ridge positions overlooking Agok and the river to new positions along the river below the ridge line.

Medal of Honor action

That evening, Kouma led the patrol of two M26 Pershing tanks and two M19 Gun Motor Carriages in Agok, along the Naktong River. Kouma placed his patrol on the west side of Agok near the Kihang ferry. At 20:00, a heavy fog covered the river, and at 22:00 mortar shells began falling on the American-held side of the river. By 22:15, this strike intensified and North Korean mortar preparation struck A Company's positions. American mortars and artillery began responding with counter-battery fire. Some of A Company's men reported hearing noises on the opposite side of the river and splashes in the water.

At 22:30, the fog lifted and Kouma saw that a North Korean pontoon bridge was being laid across the river directly in front of his position. Kouma's four vehicles attacked this structure, with Kouma manning the M2 Browning .50-caliber machine gun atop the tank. As the gunner fired the tank's main cannon, Kouma sank many of the boats attempting to cross the river with his machine gun. At 23:00, a small arms fight flared around the left side of A Company north of the tanks. This gunfire had lasted only two or three minutes when the A Company roadblock squads near the tanks heard over the field telephone that the company was withdrawing and that they should do likewise. Kouma instead opted to act as a rearguard to cover the infantry. He was wounded shortly thereafter in the foot reloading the tank's ammunition. He quickly fought off another North Korean attack across the river with his machine gun.

Kouma's force was then ambushed by a group of North Koreans dressed in US military uniforms. Kouma was wounded a second time, in the shoulder, as he beat back repeated North Korean crossings with his machine gun. Several strong attacks came within meters of the tank, but Kouma was able to drive them back despite his wounds. Eventually, the other three vehicles withdrew or were neutralized, and Kouma held the Agok crossing site until 07:30 the next morning with just his tank. At one point, the tank was surrounded and Kouma had to engage the North Koreans from outside the tank with machine gun fire at point blank range. After the tank gun's ammunition was expended, Kouma used his pistol and grenades to hold off the North Koreans. The tank then withdrew  to the newly established American lines, destroying three North Korean machine gun positions along the way. During his action, Kouma had killed an estimated 250 North Korean troops. His actions in this fight alone surpassed the highly decorated US Army soldier Audie Murphy, who was credited with 240 kills during World War II, and who had been the second most decorated US soldier in the war. His single-handed heroic battle may have served as a seed for the fictional  WWII movie, Fury (2014 film).

Once he returned to his unit, Kouma attempted to resupply his tank and return to the front lines. Instead, the wounded Kouma was ordered to evacuate for medical treatment. As he was being evacuated, Kouma again requested to return to the front lines.

Subsequent career and retirement
Kouma was returned to duty three days later. Shortly thereafter, he was promoted to master sergeant, and evacuated to the United States to be presented with the Medal of Honor. Originally, Kouma had been awarded the Distinguished Service Cross, but that award was upgraded to the Medal of Honor.

On May 19, 1951, Kouma was presented the Medal of Honor by US President Harry S. Truman in a ceremony at the White House. He got his medal alongside Carl Dodd and John Pittman, two other 2nd Infantry Division soldiers who were awarded the medal. Afterward, Kouma served as a recruiter in Omaha, Nebraska. Kouma then spent the remainder of the Korean War as a tank gunnery instructor for the US Army Armor School at Fort Knox, Kentucky.

Following the end of the war, Kouma remained in the Army. He served a second tour of duty as a recruiter, and then two tours as a tank commander, first at a unit in Fort Carson, Colorado, and then with a second unit in Germany. Though he remained in the Army for 31 years, Kouma did not see combat after his time in Korea.

Kouma retired in 1971 at the age of 52, and lived a quiet life in McDaniels, Kentucky, after retirement.

Kouma died on December 19, 1993, and was buried in the Fort Knox post cemetery. The Tank Platoon Gunnery Excellence competition at Fort Knox was subsequently named in Kouma's honor. There is also a dining facility named in his honor at Fort Knox on Eisenhower Road and a dining facility at Fort Benning.

Awards and decorations
Kouma was decorated several times during World War II. His decorations included the following medals:

Medal of Honor citation
Kouma, along with Dodd and Pittman, were the first soldiers to be awarded the Medal of Honor in the Korean War who were present for the presentation of their medals. It was reported the other nine soldiers who were awarded the medal, were done so posthumously. Unbeknownst to the public, Major General William F. Dean, who had been awarded the medal for actions in the Battle of Taejon, was actually a prisoner of war in North Korea.

See also

List of Medal of Honor recipients
List of Korean War Medal of Honor recipients

Citations

Notes

References

Sources

External links

1919 births
1993 deaths
United States Army soldiers
Korean War recipients of the Medal of Honor
United States Army Medal of Honor recipients
United States Army personnel of World War II
United States Army personnel of the Korean War
People from Butler County, Nebraska